Chiasmodon is a genus of snaketooth fishes.

Species
The currently recognized species in this genus are:
 Chiasmodon asper M. R. S. de Melo, 2009
 Chiasmodon braueri M. C. W. Weber, 1913
 Chiasmodon harteli M. R. S. de Melo, 2009
 Chiasmodon lavenbergi Prokofiev, 2008
 Chiasmodon microcephalus Norman, 1929
 Chiasmodon niger J. Y. Johnson, 1864 (black swallower)
 Chiasmodon pluriradiatus A. E. Parr, 1933
 Chiasmodon subniger Garman, 1899

References

Chiasmodontidae
Taxa named by James Yate Johnson
Marine fish genera